Notiophilus is a genus of ground beetle native to the Palearctic, the Nearctic, the Near East and North Africa.
Most known for their distictive head shape and size-body ratio the genus is sometimes referred to as the springtail stalkers.

Species
These 60 species belong to the genus Notiophilus:

 Notiophilus aeneus (Herbst, 1806)
 Notiophilus aestuans Dejean, 1826
 Notiophilus altaicus Kabak, 2014
 Notiophilus anichtchenkoi Barsevskis, 2009
 Notiophilus aquaticus (Linnaeus, 1758)
 Notiophilus biguttatus (Fabricius, 1779)
 Notiophilus borealis T.W.Harris, 1869
 Notiophilus breviusculus Solsky, 1873
 Notiophilus chihuahuae Casey, 1913
 Notiophilus chinensis Barsevskis, 2003
 Notiophilus dacatrai Barsevskis, 2004
 Notiophilus danieli Reitter, 1897
 Notiophilus directus Casey, 1920
 Notiophilus dostali Barsevskis, 2011
 Notiophilus facchinii Barsevskis, 2003
 Notiophilus fasciatus Mäklin, 1855
 Notiophilus gansuensis Barsevskis, 2003
 Notiophilus geminatus Dejean, 1831
 Notiophilus germinyi Fauvel, 1863
 Notiophilus ghilarovi Kryzhanovskij, 1995
 Notiophilus hauseri Spaeth, 1900
 Notiophilus heinzi Dostal, 1986
 Notiophilus hilaris Friederichs, 1903
 Notiophilus hyperboreus Kryzhanovskij, 1995
 Notiophilus impressifrons A.Morawitz, 1862
 Notiophilus intermedius Lindroth, 1955
 Notiophilus interstitialis Reitter, 1889
 Notiophilus jakovlevi Tschitscherine, 1903
 Notiophilus kaszabi Jedlicka, 1968
 Notiophilus katrinae Barsevskis, 2005
 Notiophilus kirschenhoferi Dostal, 1981
 Notiophilus laticollis Chaudoir, 1850
 Notiophilus marginatus Gené, 1839
 Notiophilus nemoralis Fall, 1906
 Notiophilus nepalensis Dostal, 1986
 Notiophilus nitens LeConte, 1857
 Notiophilus novemstriatus LeConte, 1847
 Notiophilus nuristanensis Barsevskis, 2011
 Notiophilus orientalis Chaudoir, 1850
 Notiophilus ovalis Breit, 1914
 Notiophilus palustris (Duftschmid, 1812)
 Notiophilus persicus Breit, 1914
 Notiophilus quadripunctatus Dejean, 1826
 Notiophilus radians Andrewes, 1926
 Notiophilus rufipes Curtis, 1829
 Notiophilus schawalleri Barsevskis, 2003
 Notiophilus semenovi Tschitscherine, 1903
 Notiophilus semiopacus Eschscholtz, 1833
 Notiophilus semistriatus Say, 1823
 Notiophilus sibiricus Motschulsky, 1844
 Notiophilus sichuanensis Barsevskis, 2003
 Notiophilus sierranus Casey, 1920
 Notiophilus simulator Fall, 1906
 Notiophilus spaethi Reitter, 1913
 Notiophilus specularis Bates, 1881
 Notiophilus stackelbergi Kryzhanovskij, 1995
 Notiophilus sublaevis Solsky, 1873
 Notiophilus substriatus G.R.Waterhouse, 1833
 Notiophilus sylvaticus Eschscholtz, 1833
 Notiophilus tshitsherini Zaitzev, 1916

References

External links
Notiophilus at Fauna Europaea

 
Nebriinae
Carabidae genera
Taxa named by André Marie Constant Duméril